Mohamed Shoukry El Husseiny Sarhan (1925–1997), better known as Shoukry Sarhan, was an Egyptian actor. He is regarded as one of the greatest Egyptian actors of all time.

Life and career 
Sarhan was born in El Sharqiya, Egypt on 12 March 1925. He graduated from the "High Institute of Acting in Egypt" in 1947. In 1949, Sarhan acted in his first movie, Lahalibo (لهاليبو, "Lahaleebo"). His rise to stardom was in 1951 when Youssef Chahine, a famous Egyptian film director, chose him for the lead role in the movie Son of the Nile (ابن النيل, "Ibn El-Nil"). In 1957, he starred in Ezz El-Dine Zulficar's Back Again (رد قلبي, "Rodda Qalbi"). His notable films included Mahmoud Zulfikar's The Unknown Woman (المرأة المجهولة , "Al-Mar'a Al-Maghoola") Kamal El Sheikh's Chased by the Dogs (اللص والكلاب, "Al-Less wal Kelab") among many others.

Sarhan had earned the title "The young man of the screen". He received several awards throughout his career. President Gamal Abdel Nasser honored Sarhan with the Order of the Republic. In 1984, he received a Best Actor's award for his lead role, with Faten Hamama, in the movie Lelt El qabd 'Ala Fatema (ليلة القبض على فاطمة, "The Night of Fatima's Arrest"), which was directed by Henry Barakat.

During the celebrations of the centennial of cinema he was nominated by Egyptian critics as the best actor of the century in Egypt, having participated more than any other actor in The Greatest 100 Egyptian films.

Sahran's last movie was El-Gablawi (الجبلاوي) in 1991. He died in 1997.

References

External links 
 

1925 births
1997 deaths
Egyptian male film actors
20th-century Egyptian male actors